Kandamangalam was former state assembly constituency in Viluppuram district in Tamil Nadu. It is a Scheduled Caste reserved constituency.

Members of Legislative Assembly

Election results

2006

2001

1996

1991

1989

1984

1980

1977

1971

1967

References

External links

Former assembly constituencies of Tamil Nadu
Viluppuram district